Chenarak or Chanarak may refer to:
 Chenarak, Fars
 Chenarak, Razavi Khorasan
 Chenarak, Yazd